Cachrys is a genus of flowering plant in the family Apiaceae. Its species are native around the Mediterranean and eastwards to Iran.

Species
, Plants of the World Online accepted the following species:
Cachrys alpina M.Bieb.
Cachrys cristata DC.
Cachrys libanotis L.
Cachrys longiloba DC.
Cachrys pungens Jan ex Guss.
Cachrys sicula L.

References 

Apioideae
Apioideae genera